Sara Gallego Sotelo (born 11 October 2000) is a Spanish athlete. She is the Spanish national record holder over 400 metres hurdles.
In 2021, Gallego ran 55.20 to win silver at the 2021 European Athletics U23 Championships in Tallinn. In doing so, Gallego broke the national record held previously by Cristina Pérez and set 33 years previously.

In May 2022, Gallego lowered her national record to 54.87 in Alicante. Two weeks after that, at the Spanish Championship, Gallego lowered her own national record again with a run of 54.34.

At the 2022 IAAF World Championship in Eugene, Oregon, Gallego qualified for the semi-finals with a run of 55.09. Gallego did not reach the final but only ran 15 hundredth's of a second outside her personal best as she finished behind Femke Bol and Britton Wilson.

International competitions

References

2000 births
Living people
World Athletics Championships athletes for Spain
Spanish female hurdlers
21st-century Spanish women